This Is Good is the debut album by Canadian pop/rock singer-songwriter Hannah Georgas. It was released April 27, 2010 by Hidden Pony Records.

The album was a longlisted nominee for the 2010 Polaris Music Prize.

Track listing
All songs by Hannah Georgas except where noted.

Personnel

Hannah Georgas – vocals, keyboards, synthesizer
Ryan Guldemond – guitar, string arrangements, keyboards, synthesizer, upright bass, vocals
Aaron Joyce – guitar
Robbie Driscoll – electric bass, banjo, ukulele, upright bass
Niko Friesen – drums
Andrea Stradze – violin
Peggy Lee – cello
Jeremy Page – clarinet
Jonathan Sykes – trumpet
Jeremy Holmes – upright bass
Howard Redekopp – vocals

Production
 Howard Redekopp – record producer, engineer, mixer

References

2010 debut albums
Hannah Georgas albums